Urdu Wikipedia, started in January 2004, is the Urdu language edition of Wikipedia, a free, open-content encyclopedia. There were 4 million page views in January 2022.

History 
Urdu Wikipedia was launched on 27 January 2004; it is the second Wikipedia to use a variety of Hindustani, the first being the Hindi Wikipedia, launched in July 2003. At first, Urdu Wikipedia faced technical problems with the Urdu script font, but now this matter is mostly settled; some unsolved areas remain. Urdu is written in Perso-Arabic script, a right-to-left writing system. As a result, users sometimes need to configure their operating systems and web browsers accordingly.

Currently Urdu Wikipedia uses "Urdu Naskh Asiatype" font, which was introduced and is freely distributed by BBC at BBC Urdu Service website.  The font is primarily used for article bodies and headings. Urdu variation of Times New Roman is used for navigation links. Both of these fonts are variations of Naskh style. Some Pakistani variations of complex Nasta'liq script are also supported only as a secondary choice in class definitions of CSS, i.e. if default font is not found on client system, then Nasta'liq script is used. The translation of the Wikipedia interface and project information pages into Urdu is still in progress. Some pages about how to edit have been translated.

In January 2016, Urdu Wikipedia ranked first in the number of articles as compared to other Indian languages. In India, Urdu Wikipedia activities are hosted and promoted by the Dehalvi Wikimedia User Group. The group hosted its first educational program in Deoband in February 2020. Urdu is the second most popular Wikipedia in Pakistan, behind English. It receives approximately 2 million pageviews in the country, and around 610 thousand in India, as of November 2022.

Milestones timeline

Users and editors 

Urdu Wikipedia is having approximately 320 contributors per month. Most users are from Pakistan, although there are many users from India as well. There also notable users from Saudi Arabia. Much like the rest of Indic languages, Urdu suffers from an acute shortage of contributors due to various reasons. Ahmed Nisar, a contributor of Urdu Wikipedia from India, claims that some of the reasons is the preference of the people for English language media, as well the lack of Urdu speaking experts which are well versed in various aspects of the current affairs.

See also 

 History of Wikipedia
 Reliability of Wikipedia
 Wikipedia community

References

External links

 Official handle of Urdu Wikipedia on Facebook
 Official handle of Urdu Wikipedia on Twitter
Official handle of Urdu Wikipedia on Instagram
  Urdu Wikipedia
  Urdu Wikipedia mobile version

Wikipedias by language
Internet properties established in 2004
Languages on Wikipedia
Urdu-language websites
Urdu-language encyclopedias
American online encyclopedias